Rudolf Perak (1891–1972) was an Austrian composer of film scores who worked mainly in Germany. He wrote the scores for many documentaries during his career, including a film directed by Leni Riefenstahl.

Selected filmography
 Wedding at Lake Wolfgang (1933)
 Stronger Than Regulations (1936)
 Stjenka Rasin (1936)
 Signal in the Night (1937)
 Twelve Minutes After Midnight (1939)
 Melody of a Great City (1943)
 Oh, You Dear Fridolin (1952)
 Bis fünf nach zwölf – Adolf Hitler und das 3. Reich (1953)

References

Bibliography 
Rother, Rainer & Bott, Martin H. Leni Riefenstahl: The Seduction of Genius.Continuum International Publishing 2003.

External links 
 

1891 births
1972 deaths
Austrian composers
Film people from Vienna
Austrian emigrants to Germany